Ed Tant is a freelance journalist in Athens, Georgia and biweekly columnist for the Athens Banner-Herald newspaper.

He has written since 1974 for a variety of publications including The Progressive, Z magazine, Remember magazine, The Athens Observer, Astronomy, Odyssey children’s magazine, National Comment,  the Sinclair Lewis Centennial magazine,  and unpaid, unsolicited opinion pieces in the letters sections of The New York Times, The Nation, The Guardian, The Atlanta Constitution and The Village Voice.

He is also a volunteer and speaker at the annual Athens Human Rights Festival, usually held in May in downtown Athens, Georgia on College Square. His full-time occupation is as a security guard for the Georgia Museum of Art at the University of Georgia for which he receives a salary of around $16,000.

Tant has been a political activist since 1968, traveling over 50,000 miles (80,000 km) to cover protest marches, demonstrations and political rallies throughout the U.S. He has received the Athens/Western Circuit Bar Association's Media Award for writing about legal issues and he also has been awarded the Athens Human Relations Council's Martin Luther King Community Service Award. In 2005, Georgia Trend magazine named Tant to its list of “Who’s Who Among Georgia Newspaper Columnists.” His newspaper columns appear frequently at such Web sites as Smirking Chimp out of New York City and the Neil Rogers radio show's Web site out of Miami. He has also interviewed Howard Zinn and David Dellinger during his career.

References

External links
 Homepage
 Athens Human Rights Festival

American male journalists
Year of birth missing (living people)
Living people